Sázava is a river in Bohemia, Czech Republic.
It is a right tributary of the Vltava.

Its sources are in the area of Žďár nad Sázavou, including Velké Dářko (Polnička, Žďár nad Sázavou District).

It meanders in a generally north-westwardly direction, past Hamry nad Sázavou, Havlíčkův Brod,
Sázava, Přibyslav, Nové Dvory, Pohled, Havlíčkův Brod, Světlá nad Sázavou, Ledeč nad Sázavou, Chřenovice, across the Vysočina-Central Bohemian border to Vlastějovice, Horka II, Zruč nad Sázavou, where it is joined by its right tributary Želivka, Kácov, Soběšín, Český Šternberk, Rataje nad Sázavou, Ledečko and Sázava-Černé Budy (Sázava Monastery).

From here it flows generally westward, past Stříbrná Skalice, Chocerady, Hvězdonice, Senohraby (Zlenice Castle), Čtyřkoly, Čerčany, Poříčí nad Sázavou, Nespeky, Týnec nad Sázavou, Krhanice, Kamenný Přívoz, reaching its confluence with the Vltava (at the latter's 78.3 km mark) at the boundary between  Hradištko and Davle, just south of the municipal border of Prague.

References

Rivers of the Central Bohemian Region
Rivers of the Vysočina Region